Scopula turbidaria is a species of moth in the  family Geometridae. It is found in France, Spain and Portugal. It is also found in North Africa (including Morocco).

Subspecies
Scopula turbidaria turbidaria
Scopula turbidaria steinbacheri Prout, 1935

Scopula turbidaria turbulentaria was raised to species rank by Hausmann in 2004.

References

External links
Lepiforum.de

Moths described in 1819
turbidaria
Moths of Europe
Moths of Africa
Taxa named by Jacob Hübner